Andrey Borzukov (sometimes listed as Andriy Borzukov, born 20 October 1971) is a Ukrainian sprint canoeist who competed from the mid-1990s to the mid-2000s (decade). He won two medals in the K-4 200 m event at the ICF Canoe Sprint World Championships with a gold in 2003 and a bronze in 1994.

Borzukov also competed in the K-4 1000 m event at the 1996 Summer Olympics in Atlanta, but was eliminated in the semifinals.

References

1971 births
Canoeists at the 1996 Summer Olympics
Living people
Olympic canoeists of Ukraine
Ukrainian male canoeists
ICF Canoe Sprint World Championships medalists in kayak